Caballero, the Spanish word for "knight" and a common surname, can refer to:

 Anna Caballero, member of the California State Assembly
 Bernardino Caballero, President of Paraguay from 1880 until 1886 and founder of the Colorado Party
 Celestino Caballero, Panamanian boxer
 Elizabeth Caballero, Cuban-American soprano
 Enrique Caballero Peraza, Mexican medical doctor, psychologist and politician
 Félix Caballero, Dominican priest
 Fernán Caballero, pseudonym adopted from the name of a village in the province of Ciudad Real by the Spanish novelist Cecilia Francisca Josefa Arrom de Ayala
 Flavio Caballero, Colombian actor
 Francisco Largo Caballero, Spanish politician and trade unionist
 Gabriel Caballero, Mexican footballer
 Guy Caballero, a character in the Canadian sketch comedy series SCTV portrayed by Joe Flaherty
 Javiera Caballero, American politician
 Juan Caballero y Ocio, priest
 Jorge Luis Caballero Torres, Mexican footballer
 Jorge López Caballero, Colombian footballer
 Luis Caballero (footballer), Paraguayan footballer
 Manuel Caballero, Venezuelan historian
 María Cristina Caballero, Colombian journalist
 María Emilia Caballero, Mexican mathematician
 Mauro Caballero, Paraguayan footballer
 Miguel Caballero Ortega, Spanish ski mountaineer and long-distance runner
 Pino Caballero Gil (born 1968), Spanish computer scientist
 Raymond Caballero, the mayor of El Paso, Texas from 2001 until 2003
 Raimundo Diosdado Caballero, Catholic miscellaneous writer
 Roxann Caballero (born 1958), American actress and director, known as Roxann Dawson, R. Biggs, R. Biggs-Dawson
 Samuel Caballero, Honduran football defender
 Steve Caballero, professional skateboarder
 Willy Caballero, Argentinian soccer player

Spanish-language surnames
Occupational surnames